N05 may refer to :

 ATC code N05 Psycholeptics, a subgroup of the Anatomical Therapeutic Chemical Classification System
 Hackettstown Airport FAA code
 Nephritic syndrome ICD-10 code
FLYeasy IATA airline designator

See also
N5 (disambiguation)